Estet (stylised as ESTET) is a 2010 Malaysian romantic comedy-drama film directed by Mamat Khalid. It was released 4 November 2010. It is produced by his company Naga XV, and is in Malay and Tamil languages. The film was nominated for 10 categories in the 23rd Malaysia Film Festival, in which it won the Special Jury Award category while one of its actors, Shashi Taran, won the Best Supporting Actor category.

Cast 
 Shashi Tharan as Shashi
 Farid Kamil as Farid, Shashi's Malay friend.
 Jasmin as Geetha, Shashi's sister.
 Soffi Jikan as Junna
 S. Veerasingam as Ponniah
 Kamarul Haji Yusof as Yaacop, Farid's father
 Gandii Nathen as Apaa Shashi, Shashi's father.
 Mislina Mustaffa as Kak Lina
 Mohan as Mohan
 Jayasree as Jayasree
 Rosyam Nor as Kublai Khan

David Arumugam of the band Alleycats also makes a brief cameo appearance in the film.

References

External links
 ESTET from Sinema Malaysia

2010 films
Malaysian comedy films
Malay-language films
Tamil-language Malaysian films
Films directed by Mamat Khalid
Films with screenplays by Mamat Khalid